George McPhail (born c. 1928) was a Canadian football player who played for the Ottawa Rough Riders, Regina Roughriders, Winnipeg Blue Bombers and Montreal Alouettes.

References

1920s births
Possibly living people